Wallqaqucha (Quechua wallqa collar, qucha lake, "collar lake", also spelled Huallcacocha) is a lake in the Cordillera Blanca in the Andes of  Peru. It is located in the Ancash Region, Carhuaz Province, Shilla District, northwest of Wallqan. Wallqaqucha lies at the feet of Chiqllarahu, northeast and north of Awkishqucha and Chiqllaqucha.

References 

Lakes of Peru
Lakes of Ancash Region